Cala is a town and municipality located in the province of Huelva, Spain. According to the 2005 census, the city has a population of 1,324 inhabitants.

The region has been mined since Carthaginian times and the local mines, Minas de Cala are well known for the minerals Skutterudite and Nickeline.

Demographics

References

Mineralogy and origin of the skarn from Cala (Huelva, Spain), F. Velasco, and J. M. Amigo, Economic Geology, v. 76, no. 3, p. 719-727, May 1981

External links
Cala - Sistema de Información Multiterritorial de Andalucía
Minas de Cala

Municipalities in the Province of Huelva